Jon Ritman is a game designer and programmer notable for his work on 1980s computer games, primarily for the ZX Spectrum and Amstrad CPC home computers.

His first experience with a computer was when he was 13, his first computer was a Sinclair ZX81 he bought in 1981.

His first game, Namtir Raiders for the ZX81, gained its name from his surname reversed. He first drew attention with his games Bear Bovver and Match Day for the ZX Spectrum.

In 1988, Ritman was voted Best Programmer Of The Year at the Golden Joystick Awards.

In 2014 Ritman appeared in the documentary feature film From Bedrooms to Billions, which tells the story of the British video game industry from 1979 to its release.

Games
Namtir Raiders, Artic
Cosmic Debris, Artic
3D Combat Zone, Artic
Dimension Destructors, Artic
Bear Bovver, Artic
Match Day series, Ocean
Batman, Ocean
Head over Heels, Ocean
Monster Max, Rare/Titus
Super Match Soccer, 1998

Ritman also worked on two other football games that were not published:
 Final Whistle was developed for the Razz arcade system, but was cancelled as it looked like an improved version of Match Day II not suitable for arcade games.
 Soccerama was developed for Nintendo Entertainment System, but did not pass Nintendo's quality control due to bugs.

References

External links
Jon Ritman's website
Interview with Ritman at crashonline.org.uk
Ritman interview at computeremuzone.com
Ritman interview at tacgr.emuunlim.com
Biography

British video game designers
British computer programmers
Golden Joystick Award winners
Living people
Video game programmers
Year of birth missing (living people)